The Ports-To-Plains Corridor, also known as National Highway System High Priority Corridor 38, is a highway corridor between the United States Mexico border at Laredo, Texas and Denver, Colorado. It is the southern third of the Ports-to-Plains Alliance. The reason for proposed improvements to this corridor is to expedite the transportation of goods and services from Mexico in the United States and vice versa. The Ports-To-Plains Corridor starts in South Texas and traverses through Texas, New Mexico, Oklahoma, and ends in Denver, Colorado.

The Intermodal Surface Transportation Efficiency Act of 1991 made the Ports-to-Plains Corridor National Highway System High Priority Corridor 38 in 1998.  The High Priority designation, which applies to 90 routes or groups of routes nationally, does not create any additional design requirements and does not have a separate federal funding source.

Route description
The Ports-to-Plains Corridor starts at the Mexico–United States border at a bridge crossing in Laredo, Texas, where it meets and runs concurrent with I-35, a six-lane freeway. North of Laredo, the route follows US 83, a two-lane highway to Carrizo Springs, Texas, where the route follows US 277 through Eagle Pass, Del Rio, Sonora, and San Angelo, Texas. North of San Angelo, the route follows US 87, a four-lane highway, through Big Spring and Lamesa and finally to Lubbock. Additionally, the corridor connects to Midland using State Highway Route 158 between Sterling City and Midland and State Highway Route 349 between Midland and Lamesa.

North of Lubbock, the route follows I-27 to Amarillo. North of Amarillo, the route is again marked as US 87 and returns to four-lane highway. At Dumas, a spur of the route extends northwest to Raton, New Mexico on mostly four-lane US 87.

The route continues north from Dumas using US 287. At the Oklahoma/Texas border, the route continues along US 287. It passes through Boise City, Oklahoma in the western panhandle.

Continuing north, the route follows US 287 through Springfield, Lamar, and Kit Carson, Colorado. North of Kit Carson, the route follows US 40 to Limon, Colorado, where it joins I-70 for the final leg into Denver, Colorado, where the highway ends at an interchange with I-25/US 6/US 85/US 87.

The cities of Laredo, Eagle Pass, and Del Rio are each located on the U.S./Mexico Border and are gateways to trade between the two countries.

Future
In 2015, the Texas Department of Transportation (TxDOT) published the Initial Assessment Report: Extension of I-27/Ports-to-Plains Corridor. The purpose of this document is to provide a high-level overview of 1) existing conditions; 2) potential upgrade options; 3) a summary of public outreach and reaction; and, 4) potential next steps for TxDOT to consider toward further planning, public outreach and corridor development. Assessment results included: “Overwhelmingly, stakeholders expressed the urgency in TxDOT engaging in a new update of prior corridor studies, focusing on an extension of I-27, rather than upgrading incrementally the I-27/P2P corridor.” Further, the Assessment stated: “Investments have been made within the corridor to improve safety and mobility; however, there are still sections that need to be addressed.” It found: “Some areas along the corridor have seen notable population growth and growth in the number of passenger cars and especially trucks and are projected to continue to grow. This translates to more demands on the transportation system.”

In 2018 TxDOT completed the Texas Freight Mobility Plan. The stated purpose is: “provides the state with a blueprint for facilitating continued economic growth through a comprehensive, multimodal strategy for addressing freight transportation needs and moving goods efficiently and safely throughout the state. The Plan identified priority strategic projects and initiatives based on current and future freight volumes, trends and economic opportunities. The I-27 Extension – from Lubbock to Laredo was identified as one of two Strategic Projects. The Plan stated that I-27 would be a catalyst to spur economic development in this part of the state and support agricultural and energy sector development, the state’s economic engine, and that the I-27 extension would provide the only major north-south corridor in Texas west of I-35, and it would intersect three major east-west routes: I-10, I-20 and I-40. It also recommended that TxDOT complete a more detailed study of the extension to determine whether an incremental improvement approach or a complete interstate facility approach would meet safety and mobility needs.

In June 2019, Governor Greg Abbott signed Texas House Bill 1079 which directs TxDOT to conduct a comprehensive study of the Ports-to-Plains Corridor. The study must evaluate the feasibility of, and the costs and logistical matters associated with, improvements that create a four-lane divided highway which meets interstate highway standards to the extent possible.

This study would detail improvements to extend Interstate 27 both north and south which includes the Ports-to-Plains Corridor north of Amarillo to the Texas-Oklahoma border, to the Texas-New Mexico border, and south of Lubbock to Laredo.

Next, TxDOT establishes an Interstate 27 Advisory Committee which is composed of the county judge, an elected county official, or the administrator of the county’s road department, as designated by the county judge, of each county along the Ports-to-Plains Corridor along with the mayor, city manager, or assistant city manager, as designated by the mayor of Amarillo, Big Spring, Carrizo Springs, Dalhart, Del Rio, Dumas, Eagle Pass, Eldorado, Lamesa, Laredo, Lubbock, Midland, Odessa, San Angelo, Sonora, Sterling City, Stratford, and Tahoka. The advisory committee would meet at least twice each year on a rotational basis in Lubbock and San Angelo.

Additionally, TxDOT, in conjunction with the Advisory Committee, establishes committees for each geographic segment along the Ports-to-Plains Corridor as determined by TxDOT.  The Segment Committees consist of volunteers who represent municipalities, counties, metropolitan planning organizations, ports, chambers of commerce, and economic development organizations including the oil and gas industry, the trucking industry, TxDOT representatives, and any other interested parties.

Each Segment Committee will submit a report by June 30, 2020 to the Advisory Committee providing input for the study conducted by TxDOT including priority recommendations for improvement and expansion of the Ports-to-Plains Corridor. 
TxDOT will also host quarterly public meetings on a rotational basis in Amarillo, Laredo, Lubbock, and San Angelo to gather public feedback on improvements or expansions to the Ports-to-Plains Corridor.

Not later than January 1, 2021, TxDOT will submit a report on the results of the study to the governor, lieutenant governor, speaker of the house of representatives, and presiding officer of each standing committee of the legislature with jurisdiction over transportation matters.

HB 1079 was patterned after a similar effort with Interstate 69 which was designated in 1998 as a Future Interstate in the TEA-21 reauthorization legislation.  The Interstate 69 study was then completed in 2014.

See also
 Caprock Chief, a former proposed passenger rail route along the corridor

References

External links
High-Priority Corridors: The Ports-To-Plains Corridor
Ports-To-Plains Trade Corridor Coalition web site
Ports-To-Plains Transportation Corridor Map

Highways in the United States
Roads in Texas
Roads in New Mexico
Roads in Oklahoma
Roads in Colorado
Roads in Wyoming
Roads in Montana
Transportation in Texas
Transportation in New Mexico
Transportation in Oklahoma
Transportation in Colorado
Transportation in Wyoming
Transportation in Montana
Transportation in Lubbock, Texas
Interstate 35
U.S. Route 83
U.S. Route 87
U.S. Route 287
Interstate 70